Wilde Gomes da Silva (born 14 April 1981), commonly known as Wilde, is a Brazilian futsal player who plays for AC Sparta Praha as a Pivot.

Honours
2 FIFA Futsal World Cup (2008, 2012)
2 UEFA Futsal Cup (2011/12, 2013/14)
7 División de Honor (2005/06, 2006/07, 2008/09, 2009/10, 2010/11, 2011/12, 2012/13)
4 Copa del Rey (2010/11, 2011/12, 2012/13, 2013/14)
5 Copa de España (2008, 2010, 2011, 2012, 2013)
1 Grand Prix (2009)
1 Liga Futsal (2002/03)
3 Supercopa de España (2006, 2010, 2014)
1 Intercontinental (2002)
1 Copa Ibérica (2007)
2 Campeonatos Metropolitanos (2000, 2002)
1 Campeonato Estatal (2002)
1 Copa Río São Paulo Minas (2002)
2 Best Pívot LNFS (2008/09, 2009/10)
2 Top scorer LNFS (2008/09, 2009/10)
1 Russian Superliga (2016/17)

References

External links
lnfs.es

1981 births
Living people
Brazilian men's futsal players
Brazilian expatriate sportspeople in Spain
Xota FS players
ElPozo Murcia FS players
FC Barcelona Futsal players
Sportspeople from Ceará